The Sack of Campeche was a 1663 raid by pirates led by Christopher Myngs and Edward Mansvelt which became a model for later coastal pirate raids of the buccaneering era.

Background

Having successfully raided Santiago de Cuba in 1662, Myngs announced that his next target would be the heavily fortified coastal town, Campeche, in what is now southern Mexico. Pirate captains from across the Caribbean volunteered their services, and Myngs amassed the largest pirate fleet ever seen with 14 ships and 1400 pirates. The primarily English fleet was subsequently joined by four French ships and three Dutch privateer ships for a total of more than 20 vessels. Leading the fleet was Myngs' flagship HMS Centurion and the smaller vice-flagship the Griffin. The fleet included already-well-known pirates Mansvelt, Henry Morgan and Abraham Blauvelt. It is likely it included other younger sailors who would later captain pirate vessels of their own and replicate Myngs' tactics. They left Port Royal in January, joined by other smaller vessels as they went but losing contact with the Griffin.

The raid

Early the following month, the fleet arrived in Campeche Bay. By night, Myngs landed approximately 1000 men a short distance from the city on 8 February 1663. The following morning, Spanish lookouts saw the fleet's smaller ships at first light and sought to raise the alarm, though unaware that Myngs' much larger 40-gun flagship lay just out of sight. Regardless, the warning came too late and the pirates attacked at approximately 8:00 am. The pirates initially struggled against the city's 150-strong militia who used high ground of flat-roofed stone houses to their advantage. Fighting was fierce and Myngs was injured. He was returned to his ship leaving Mansvelt in charge. After a 2-hour-long battle, 50 Spanish defenders and 30 English, Dutch and French pirates were dead. The sole surviving Spanish official agreed to terms of surrender and the pirates sacked the city, taking an additional 14 vessels from the harbour when they left 2 weeks later. The pirates plundered a total of 150,000 Spanish pieces of eight.

Aftermath

The defeat of Campeche's defences was so comprehensive and the subsequent outrage so strong that King Charles was forced to forbid further similar raids. That policy was enforced across the Caribbean for the remainder of the term of Governor Thomas Modyford. When he died in 1679, similar raids were organised including the attack on Veracruz in 1683 and the raid on Cartagena later that same year. Both plans involved landing a large ground-based force to attack a fortified settlement which otherwise might have been able to defend itself against a seaborne raid.

Myngs returned to England the following year to recover from his injuries.

See also
 Buccaneer
 Piracy in the Caribbean

References

1663 in New Spain
Campeche
Campeche
Campeche
Campeche
Campeche City